Elvira Popescu (in French, Elvire Popesco; 10 May 1894 – 11 December 1993) was a Romanian-French stage and film actress and theatre director. During the 1930s and 1940s, she starred in a number of French comedy films.

Life and career
In 1911  was making the first Romanian films to deal with fiction. He employed Popesco as well as other leading actors like Nottara and Romanescu. The first two films were called "Fatal Love" and "Spin a Yarn". No copies are known of these films. Popesco made her debut at the National Theatre Bucharest at age 16.

In 1919 she became artistic director of the Excelsior Theatre. In 1921, Popescu started Teatrul Mic, which she managed in parallel with the Excelsior. In 1923, she starred in the movie Țigăncușa de la iatac, directed by Alfred Halm.

At the urging of Louis Verneuil, the French playwright, Popescu moved in 1924 to Paris. Under Verneuil's direction, she played the leading role in Ma Cousine de Varsovie, at the Théâtre Michel (1923). She also played in Tovaritch (1933), La Machine infernale (1954),  Nina (1949), and La Mamma (1957). Later on, she was director of Théâtre de Paris (1956–1965), and Théâtre Marigny (1965–1978).  At age 84, she played again in La Mamma.

Elvira Popescu also played in movies, such as La Présidente (Fernand Rivers, 1938), Tricoche et Cacolet (Pierre Colombier, 1938), Ils étaient neuf célibataires (Sacha Guitry, 1939), Paradis perdu (Abel Gance, 1940), Austerlitz (Abel Gance, 1960), and Purple Noon (René Clément, 1960).

Personal life 

Shortly after her debut in 1910, Popescu married comedian Aurel Athanasescu and they had a daughter named Tatiana. After a few years, she divorced, and married Ion Manolescu-Strunga, Minister of Industry and Commerce (who was to die in Sighet Prison in the 1950s).  Her third husband was Count Maximilien Sébastien Foy (born in Paris on 17 April 1900, died in Neuilly-sur-Seine on 11 November 1967).

She died in Paris at age 99, and was interred at Père Lachaise Cemetery.

Honours

In 1987, Elvira Popescu received the first honorary Molière Award for career achievements.
In 1989, President François Mitterrand conferred upon her the Légion d’honneur.

Legacy
 While married to Manolescu-Strunga, she lived in a house not far from the University of Bucharest.
 From 1930 to 1985, Elvira Popescu lived in a villa in Mézy-sur-Seine, Yvelines. The villa, acquired from fashion designer  Paul Poiret, and remodelled in 1932 by architect Paul Boyer, was declared a historic monument in 1984, but it has since decayed.  Bought for 1.8 million French francs in 1999, it is open occasionally to the public.
 Together with Elena Văcărescu, Anna de Noailles, and Marthe Bibesco, Elvira Popescu is considered to be the inspiration for Henri Matisse's painting, La Blouse Roumaine (1940).

Partial filmography

 The Independence of Romania (1912) - Țăranca
 Țigăncușa dela iatac (1923) - Maria Tortusanu -Basil's fiancée
 L'étrangère (1931) - Dora Clarkson
 My Cousin from Warsaw (1931) - Sonia Varilovna
 His Best Client (1932) - Edwige
 Une femme chipée (1934) - Hélène Larsonnier
 Dora Nelson (1935) - Dora Nelson et Suzanne Verdier
 The Lover of Madame Vidal (1936) - Catherine Vidal
 The King (1936) - Thérèse Marnix - une actrice célèbre
 The Man of the Hour (1937) - Mona Thalia
 The House Opposite (1937) - Madame Anna
 The Club of Aristocrats (1937) - La comtesse Irène Waldapowska
 The Green Jacket (1937) - La duchesse de Maulévrier
 À Venise, une nuit (1937) - Nadia Mortal
 La présidente (1938) - Vérotcha
 Tricoche and Cacolet (1938) - Bernardine Van der Pouf
 Bargekeepers Daughter (1938) - La reine de Silistrie
 Mon curé chez les riches (1938) - Lisette Cousinet
 Eusèbe député (1939) - Mariska
 The Fatted Calf (1939) - Madame Rameau
 Sacred Woods (1939) - La princesse Dorothée
 Nine Bachelors (1939) - Comtesse Stacia Batchefskaïa
 Behind the Facade (1939) - Francine Margerie
 Paradise Lost (1940) - Sonia Vorochine
 The Mondesir Heir (1940) - Erika Axelos
 Parade en 7 nuits (1941) - Madame Fanny
 Le valet maître (1941) - Antonia - une effervescente étrangère
 L'âge d'or (1942) - Véra Termutzki
 Mademoiselle Swing (1942) - Sofia de Vinci
 The Blue Veil (1942) - Mona Lorenza
 Frederica (1942) - Frédérica
 Madly in Love (1943) - Arabella
 Purple Noon (1960) - Mrs. Popova
 Austerlitz (1960) - Laetitia Bonaparte

Notes

References
  Dana Ciobanu, "Sinucidere pentru Elvira Popescu", Jurnalul Național, March 1, 2004
 Constantin Roman, "Blouse Roumaine", 2001–2002
  "Elvira Popescu", at Mari Români
 "Families of Jules and Théodore Porgès"
  "Elvire Popesco", at CinéArtistes
  Lucian Pop, "Conace boierești pentru cei care vor să se simtă moşieri", at Muse Imobiliare, July 20, 2005
   "Marigny - Salle Popesco" at Theatre online

External links

 Short bio, from Salons
 Short bio , from Mézy-sur-Seine Municipality

1894 births
1993 deaths
French stage actresses
French film actresses
French theatre managers and producers
Women theatre managers and producers
Romanian stage actresses
Romanian film actresses
Romanian silent film actresses
Romanian theatre managers and producers
Recipients of the Legion of Honour
French people of Romanian descent
Actresses from Bucharest
Burials at Père Lachaise Cemetery
20th-century French actresses
Theatre people from Bucharest
National University of Music Bucharest alumni